Monroe is a city in Benton County, Oregon, United States. The population was 651 at the 2018 census. It is part of the Corvallis, Oregon Metropolitan Statistical Area. Monroe is located midway between Eugene and Corvallis along Highway 99W and the city experiences a strong friendly rivalry between fans of the Oregon Ducks and the Oregon State Beavers.

Geography

History 

The city formed around a small sawmill established by Joseph White in 1852. By 1853, there was a small settlement known as White's Mill. Around the same time, Roland Hinton formed the town of Starr Point north of White's Mill. In 1857, Starr Point combined with White's Mill to form the town of Monroe. The city quickly became a center for paddle boat traffic.

It was one of the largest cities in the state for many years. Monroe High School was built in the 1920s. Since the construction of I-5 in the 1960s, the city has turned into a rural farming community. It is the home of historic Hull-Oakes Lumber Mill, the only steam-powered sawmill operating in the U.S.

Demographics

2010 census
As of the census of 2010, there were 617 people, 251 households, and 165 families residing in the city. The racial makeup of the city was 89.0% White, 0.2% African American, 1.3% Native American, 0.2% Asian, 6.6% from other races, and 2.8% from two or more races. Hispanic or Latino people of any race were 16.2% of the population.

There were 251 households, out of which 26.7% had children under the age of 18 living with them, 46.6% were married couples living together, 12.0% had a female householder with no husband present, 7.2% had a male householder with no wife present, and 34.3% were non-families. 25.1% of all households were made up of individuals, and 8% had someone living alone who was 65 years of age or older. The average household size was 2.46 and the average family size was 2.92.

The median age in the city was 42.7 years. 21.6% of residents were under the age of 18; 7.7% were between the ages of 18 and 24; 23.7% were from 25 to 44; 33.7% were from 45 to 64; and 13.1% were 65 years of age or older. The gender makeup of the city was 50.2% male and 49.8% female.

2000 census
As of the census of 2000, there were 607 people, 225 households, and 166 families residing in the city. The population density was 1,274.9 people per square mile (488.3/km). There were 262 housing units at an average density of 550.3 per square mile (210.7/km). The racial makeup of the city was 96.71% White, 0.33% African American, 0.99% Native American, 0.33% Asian, 0.33% Pacific Islander, and 1.32% from two or more races. Hispanic or Latino people of any race were 10.05% of the population.

There were 225 households, out of which 39.6% had children under the age of 18 living with them, 57.3% were married couples living together, 11.6% had a female householder with no husband present, and 25.8% were non-families. 20.9% of all households were made up of individuals, and 7.1% had someone living alone who was 65 years of age or older. The average household size was 2.70 and the average family size was 3.07.

In the city, the population was spread out, with 29.7% under the age of 18, 9.2% from 18 to 24, 29.5% from 25 to 44, 23.2% from 45 to 64, and 8.4% who were 65 years of age or older. The median age was 35 years. For every 100 females, there were 109.3 males. For every 100 females aged 18 and over, there were 99.5 males.

The median income for a household in the city was $30,625, and the median income for a family was $40,714. Males had a median income of $32,083 versus $22,083 for females. The per capita income for the city was $14,970. About 12.3% of families and 12.6% of the population were below the poverty line, including 18.5% of those under age 18 and 14.0% of those age 65 or over.

Notable people
Willis C. Hawley, a member of the United States House of Representatives from 1909 to 1933 and co-sponsor of the Smoot-Hawley Tariff
Dave Wolverton, writer and novelist

References

External links

Entry for Monroe in the Oregon Blue Book
https://ci.monroe.or.us

Cities in Benton County, Oregon
Cities in Oregon
1914 establishments in Oregon
Populated places established in 1914